, also known as  is a Shinto kami.

In the Kojiki, Kotoshironushi is the son of Ōkuninushi, the earthly deity of Izumo province. When the heavenly deities sent Takemikazuchi to conquer Izumo, Ōkuninushi deferred the decision over whether to resist to his two sons. Kotoshironushi, who had been fishing at the time of Takemikizuchi's arrival, agreed to accept the rule of the heavenly gods, surrendered his spear and left Izumo. His brother Takeminakata fought with Takemikazuchi and was defeated.

Kotoshironushi is the principal deity of the Asuka shrine, and is associated with the god Ebisu. In mythology, he was an adviser to Empress Jingū during her invasion of Korea, and was one of the eight deities charged with protecting the Imperial Court. His daughter Himetataraisuzu-hime became the consort of Emperor Jimmu.

References

Shinto
Japanese deities